Norlindhia is a genus of African plants in the pot marigold tribe within the daisy family.

 Species
 Norlindhia amplectens (Harv.) B.Nord. - Cape Province
 Norlindhia aptera B.Nord. - southern Namibia
 Norlindhia breviradiata (Norl.) B.Nord. - Cape Province, southern Namibia

References 

Calenduleae
Asteraceae genera